Karim Ishan (also Romanized as Karīm Īshān) is a village in Jafarbay-ye Sharqi Rural District, Gomishan District, Torkaman County, Golestan Province, Iran. At the 2006 census, its population was 759, in 155 families.

References 

Populated places in Torkaman County